The Women's omnium competition at the 2017 World Championships was held on 14 April 2017.

Results

Scratch race
30 laps (7.5 km) were raced.

 Luo Xiaolong was relegated "for not returning to the bunch in the same location after her crash and not being in the bunch in the final kilometer"

Tempo race
27 sprints were held, each awarding a point to the winner; in addition, 20 points were added/subtracted for a lap gain/loss respectively.

Elimination race
Sprints were held every two laps; the last rider in each sprint was eliminated.

Points race and final standings
Riders' points from the previous 3 events were carried into the points race (consisting of 80 laps (20km)), in which the final standings were decided.

 Amy Cure was relegated in sprint 7 "for irregular movement to prevent [her] opponent from passing"

References

Women's omnium
UCI Track Cycling World Championships – Women's omnium